Jonathan Moore (born April 17, 1985) is an American professional golfer.

Moore was born in Oceanside, California. He enjoyed a high-profile amateur career, culminating in winning the NCAA Championship and sealing the winning point in the 2007 Walker Cup, before he left Oklahoma State University early in order to turn professional.

After a couple of years on mini-tours, Moore has since established himself as a leading professional on the Asian Tour, finishing seventh in the 2012 Order of Merit.

Amateur wins
2001 Oregon Amateur, Royal Oak Invitational, Western Junior, Robert Trent Jones Golf Trail Junior Championship, Ashworth Junior Classic
2006 Players Amateur, NCAA Championship

Professional wins (3)

Asian Development Tour wins (1)

1Co-sanctioned by the Professional Golf of Malaysia Tour

NGA Hooters Tour wins (1)
2011 Falcons Fire

Other wins (1)
2009 Coca-Cola Wal-Mart Open

Results in major championships

CUT = missed the half way cut
Note: Moore never played in the Masters Tournament or the PGA Championship.

U.S. national team appearances
Amateur
Eisenhower Trophy: 2006
Palmer Cup: 2007 (winners)
Walker Cup: 2007 (winners)

References

External links

American male golfers
Oklahoma State Cowboys golfers
Asian Tour golfers
Golfers from California
Golfers from Florida
Sportspeople from Oceanside, California
Sportspeople from Polk County, Florida
People from Davenport, Florida
1985 births
Living people